Events in the year 1835 in Belgium.

Incumbents
Monarch: Leopold I
Prime Minister: Barthélémy de Theux de Meylandt

Events

12 February – Court of Cassation finds that the laws on injury and manslaughter apply to participants in duels.
5 May – First Belgian railway line, between Brussels and Mechelen, taken into service, with three locomotives: Flèche, Eléphant, and Stephenson.
10 May – Gaspard-Joseph Labis becomes bishop of Tournai.
9 June – 1835 Belgian general election
8 August – Brussels Coin Cabinet opens
15 September – Exposition des produits de l'industrie nationale opens in Brussels.
10 October – Second provisional postal convention between Belgium and the Office of the Prince of Tour and Taxis signed in Brussels.
1 December – Catholic University of Mechelen relocates to Leuven, becoming Catholic University of Leuven.

Publications
Periodicals
 Almanach administratif et industriel de Bruxelles (Brussels, Ad. Wahlen)
 Almanach de poche de Bruxelles (Brussels, M.-E. Rampelbergh)
 Annuaire de l'Académie royale de Belgique (Brussels, M. Hayez).
 Bulletin médical Belge.
 Bulletins de l'Académie royale des sciences et belles-lettres, Volume 2 (Brussels, M. Hayez).
 Le cultivateur, journal belge d'économie rurale.
 Messager des sciences et des arts de la Belgique, vol. 3 (Ghent, D. Duvivier).
 Revue Belge (Liége, Jeunehomme frères).

Monographs and reports
 Pasinomie: collection complète des lois, décrets, arrêtés et réglements généraux qui peuvent être invoqués en Belgique.
 De l'industrie et du commerce en Belgique (Brussels, H. Remy).
 Édouard Ducpétiaux, Statistique comparée de la criminalité en France, en Belgique, en Angleterre et en Allemagne (Brussels, L. Hauman).
Louis Prosper Gachard (ed.), Collection de documents inédits concernant l'histoire de la Belgique, vol. 3 (Brussels, Louis Hauman).
 Jean-Baptiste Van Mons, Arbres fruitiers: leur culture en Belqique (Leuven, L. Dusart and H. Vandenbroeck).

Fiction
 Jules de Saint-Genois, Hembyse

Guide books
 A. X. Mauvy, The Stranger's Guide through Brussels and its Environs (Brussels, Adolphus Wahlen)
 The Traveller's Guide Through Belgium (Brussels, Adolphus Wahlen)

Births
21 January – Charles du Bois de Vroylande, politician (died 1888)
2 February – Stanislas Bormans, archivist (died 1912)
9 April – Leopold II of Belgium (died 1909)
23 August – Jules Bara, politician (died 1900)
28 September – Jean Louis Gobbaerts, composer (died 1886)
20 October – Emile De Mot, mayor of Brussels (died 1909)
4 November – Amedée Visart de Bocarmé, mayor of Bruges (died 1924)

Deaths
24 February – Gilles-Lambert Godecharle (born 1750), sculptor
3 June – Andreas Bernardus de Quertenmont (born 1750), artist

References

 
1830s in Belgium